L’Apogée is the third official album by French rap group Sexion d'Assaut composed of Maître Gims, Lefa, Barack Adama, Maska, JR O Crom, Black M, Doomams, and L.I.O. Petrodollars. This album was released on March 5, 2012 in stores and available for download.

In November 2011, an unofficial date for the album's release was announced for February 20, 2012 but on December 17, 2011, the official date was unveiled as March 5, 2012. The first title unveiled by the band is "Mets pas celle là", December 11, 2011 (after the 'Welcome To The Wa' video shot in the album's laboratory, an isolated place in Normandy). The second title unveiled on December 30, 2011 (after the Welcome To The Wa II video) is Gold Disc. The third single from L'Apogée is announced by Lefa during the Planète Rap special 22 May in Bercy for Thursday 5 January 2012. It does not however give the name, Maska simply specifying that this song will be "sentimentally strong". On January 5, the third single from the album, "Before she leaves", was released.

The Apogée is a diamond disc with more than 500,000 copies sold. The album has since sold more than 700,000 copies.

L'Apogée is their last appearance on the album released with French rappers Maître Gims, L.I.O. Pétrodollars and Barack Adama, after the departure of the Wati B.

Track listing

Charts

Weekly charts

Year-end charts

Certification

Track list: L'Apogée à Bercy 

L'Apogée à Bercy (English: L'Apogée in Bercy) is the only live album by French rap group Sexion d'Assaut  recorded on 19 November 2012 at the Accor Arena, Paris, France. on the Wati B and Jive Records labels.

The group performed songs from their album L'Apogée And songs from the first album L'École des points vitaux And songs from the compilation album En attendant L'Apogée: les Chroniques du 75.

Charts

References 

2012 albums
French-language albums